Allola Indrakaran Reddy  is an Indian politician who is the current Minister of State for Endowments,  Law and Forest, Environment, Science and Technology of Telangana since 2019. He was elected as MLA of Nirmal in  2014 General Election as BSP candidate and won over Sri Hari Rao  by margin of 10,000 votes. He later joined the TRS Party and became Minister in charge of law, housing and endowments. He was Member of Parliament of India. He was a member of the 10th and 14th Lok Sabhas. Reddy represented the Adilabad constituency of United Andhra Pradesh.

Early life and education
Allola Indrakaran Reddy was born in Yellapally, a village near Nirmal, former Adilabad district, in the state of United Andhra Pradesh. He attended Osmania University and attained B.Com. and LL.B. degrees. By profession, Reddy is an agriculturist and a social worker.

Political career
Reddy has been in active politics since early 1980s. Prior to becoming a M.P. he was also the Chairman of Zila Parishad. He was elected as a member of the legislative assembly from Nirmal, Adilabad from 1999 to 2009 for the Indian National Congress. In 2008, Reddy was elected into the 14th Lok Sabha after the by-elections.
Reddy was member of Telugu Desam Party during his term in the 10th Lok Sabha. In 2018, he contested from and got elected as a MLA from Nirmal (Assembly constituency) in the state of Telangana.

Posts held

See also
10th and 14th Lok Sabha
Adilabad (Lok Sabha constituency)
Andhra Pradesh Legislative Assembly
Government of India
Indian National Congress
Lok Sabha
Nirmal (Assembly constituency)
Parliament of India
Politics of India
Telugu Desam Party

References

Telangana politicians
India MPs 1991–1996
India MPs 2004–2009
1949 births
Bahujan Samaj Party politicians
Indian National Congress politicians
Living people
Lok Sabha members from Andhra Pradesh
People from Adilabad district
Telugu Desam Party politicians
Telugu politicians
Telangana Rashtra Samithi politicians
Telangana MLAs 2018–2023